Bédouès-Cocurès is a commune in the department of Lozère, southern France. The municipality was established on 1 January 2016 by merger of the former communes of Bédouès and Cocurès.

References

See also 
Communes of the Lozère department

Communes of Lozère
Populated places established in 2016
2016 establishments in France